Gunahon Ka Devta (Translation: The God of crimes) is a 1990 Indian Hindi-language film directed by Kawal Sharma, starring Mithun Chakraborty, Sangeeta Bijlani, Aditya Pancholi, Sujata Mehta, Ranjeeta, Shakti Kapoor, Paresh Rawal, Kulbhushan Kharbanda, Danny Denzongpa. This film was first offered to Divya Bharti, but her parents didn't permit her because they thought that she is very small in age to perform in this film. In 1990, Mithun Chakraborty played second time double role, before that he played in Paap Ki Kamaee and both films were directed by Kawal Sharma.

Plot
Inspector Baldev Sharma is an honest diligent officer who was leading his life with is wife and his smaller son named Suraj. Inspector Baldev Sharma made to trapped in murder case and he was jailed. His wife and son gets behind however his wife struggle and make his son to grow. Later years his son suraj joins the police and sees that his father is still jailed. Will Suraj prove his father's innocence ?

Cast
 Mithun Chakraborty as Inspector Baldev Raj Sharma / Suraj Sharma (Double Role)
 Aditya Pancholi as Sunny Khanna
 Sangeeta Bijlani as Bhinde's Sister
 Sujata Mehta as Inspector Shilpa Verma
 Ranjeeta as Mrs. Sharma
 Shakti Kapoor as Fake Police Inspector Bhinde
 Paresh Rawal as Advocate Khanna
 Kulbhushan Kharbanda as Dabar / Goenka
 Danny Denzongpa as Raghuveer
 Bob Christo as Bob
 Brij Gopal
 Viju Khote as Cook
 Kim as Item number 
 Disco Shanti as item number
 Shivraj
 Subbiraj as Police Inspector Verma
 Sudhir

Music
Lyrics: Indeevar

References

External links
 
 http://ibosnetwork.com/asp/filmbodetails.asp?id=Gunahon+Ka+Devta+%281990%29

1990 films
1990s Hindi-language films
Films scored by Anu Malik
Fictional portrayals of the Maharashtra Police
Films directed by Kawal Sharma